The men's 60 kg judo competition at the 2012 Summer Paralympics was held on 30 August at ExCeL London.

Results

Repechage

References

External links
 

M60
Judo at the Summer Paralympics Men's Extra Lightweight